Resa may refer to:

People
 Alexander J. Resa (1887–1964), American politician
 Neithard Resa (born 1950), German violist
  (born 1980), German pianist
 Rick Resa, American Paralympic athlete

Places
 Duga Resa, Croatia
 Resa, Semič, Slovenia

Other uses
 Runway safety area
 Newaygo County Regional Educational Service Agency
 Wayne County Regional Educational Service Agency